{{Infobox university
|name            = Aligarh Muslim University, Murshidabad Centre
|native_name     = 
|nickname        = 
|image_size      = 
|image           = 
|image_alt       = 
|caption         = 
|latin_name      = 
|motto           = allama’l-insāna mā lam ya‘lam''
|motto_lang      = ar
|mottoeng        = Taught man what he did not know (Qur'an 96:5)
|established     = 2010
|type            = Public
|endowment       = 
|faculty         = 30+
|chancellor      = 
|president       = 
|provost         = 
|vice_chancellor = Tariq Mansoor
|principal       = 
|dean            = 
|director        = 
|students         = 400+
|undergrad       = 
|postgrad        = 
|doctoral        = 
|city            = Murshidabad district
|state           = West Bengal
|country         = India
|campus          = Rural, 288 acres
|colors          = 
|free_label      = 
|free            =
|academic_affiliations    = UGC, NAAC, AIU
|footnotes       = 
|website         = 
|address         = Jangipur Barrage, Murshidabad,742223.
|coor            = 
|logo            = 
}}Aligarh Muslim University: Murshidabad Centre''' is one of the prominent educational institutions of Aligarh Muslim University. A new chapter of educational enlightenment was added to the culturally enriched soil of Bengal with the establishment of Aligarh Muslim University, Murshidabad Centre in 2010. The Centre, accredited by NAAC in A grade, is empowered by Section 5(2) (C) of the AMU (Amendment) Act, 1981 and under Section 12(2) of the University Act. [Act XL 1920 and AMU (Amendment) Act, 1972].

Geography

Location

It is located nearly 40km from Farakka and 60km from Behrampore towns of Murshidabad. It is well connected with road and railway networks. It lies 250km North of Kolkata on NH34 and the nearest railway junction is Jangipur Road (approx 08km). By air, it can be reached through Netaji Subhash Chandra Bose International Airport, Kolkata.

History
Aligarh Muslim University is the creation of the movement. The Aligarh Movement had a profound impact on the Indian society, particularly on the Muslim society in terms of Socio-Economic and Political upliftment. The impact of Aligarh Movement was not confined to the Northern India only, but its expansion could be seen on the other regions of the Indian sub-continent during the 20th century.

In 2008, the AMU submitted a detailed proposal to the Government of India for establishment of five AMU centres in different parts of the country. The government of India responded by granting fund for its two Centres Malappuram and Murshidabad.

Aligarh Muslim University has established three centres at Malappuram, (Kerala) and Murshidabad, and Kishanganj, (Bihar) while a site was identified for Aurangabad, (Maharashtra) centre.

Progress
The Murshidabad Centre of Aligarh Muslim University was established at Village & PO Jangipur Barrage, PS Suti in 2010. It started classes for the 2-years Master of Business Administration (MBA) and the 5-years BA LLB programmes in 2011.It started B.Ed. in 2013.

See also
AMU Malappuram Campus

References

Aligarh Muslim University
University and college campuses in India
Educational institutions established in 2010
Islamic universities and colleges in India